Thysanothecium is a genus of three species of lichenized fungi in the family Cladoniaceae. The genus was circumscribed by Camille Montagne and Miles Joseph Berkeley in 1846. The original specimens of the type species, T. hookeri, were collected from the area of Swan River (Australia) by James Drummond, who sent them for to William Jackson Hooker for further analysis.

References

External links
Case Studies: Thysanothecium – Australian National Botanic Gardens

Cladoniaceae
Lichen genera
Lecanorales genera
Taxa described in 1846
Taxa named by Miles Joseph Berkeley
Taxa named by Camille Montagne